XXXX Summer Bright Lager is a beer manufactured in the Australian state of Queensland by Castlemaine Perkins.

It is available in three varieties consisting of XXXX Summer Bright Lager, XXXX Summer Bright Lager with mango and XXXX Summer Bright Lager with lime.

See also

Australian pub
Beer in Australia
List of breweries in Australia

References

Australian beer brands
Kirin Group
Products introduced in 2010
2010 establishments in Australia